This list of cities, towns and villages in the Netherlands by province is a survey of lists by province:

 List of cities, towns and villages in Drenthe
 List of cities, towns and villages in Flevoland
 List of cities, towns and villages in Friesland
 List of cities, towns and villages in Gelderland
 List of cities, towns and villages in Groningen
 List of cities, towns and villages in Limburg
 List of cities, towns and villages in North Brabant
 List of cities, towns and villages in North Holland
 List of cities, towns and villages in Overijssel
 List of cities, towns and villages in South Holland
 List of cities, towns and villages in Utrecht
 List of cities, towns and villages in Zeeland

See also 
 List of cities in the Netherlands by province
 List of populated places in the Netherlands
 

 3
Populated places in the Netherlands by province